An oscillator is a device designed for oscillation.

Oscillator may also refer to:

Electronic oscillator
Voltage-controlled oscillator, used in synthesizers
Harmonic oscillator
Oscillator (technical analysis), a method used in technical analysis of financial markets
Oscillator (cellular automaton)
Oscillator (EP), an EP by Information Society

See also
Oscillation (differential equation)
Oscillation (mathematics)
Oscillation (album), a studio album by the Norwegian black/gothic metal band Trail of Tears
Oscillistor, a semiconductor device